Kate Mackenzie (born April 10, 1975) is an American rower. She competed at the 2004 Summer Olympics in Athens, in the women's coxless pair. Mackenzie was born in Novi, Michigan.

References

External links
 

1975 births
Living people
American female rowers
Olympic rowers of the United States
Rowers at the 2000 Summer Olympics
Rowers at the 2004 Summer Olympics
World Rowing Championships medalists for the United States
People from Novi, Michigan
21st-century American women